Harrisville is an unincorporated community in Cecil County, Maryland, United States. The Nathan and Susannah Harris House was listed on the National Register of Historic Places in 1984.

References

Unincorporated communities in Cecil County, Maryland
Unincorporated communities in Maryland